This article lists the winners and nominees for the NAACP Image Award for Outstanding Supporting Actor in a Comedy Series. Currently Cedric the Entertainer holds the record for most wins in this category with five.

Winners and nominees
Winners are listed first and highlighted in bold.

1990s

2000s

2010s

2020s

Multiple wins and nominations

Wins

 5 wins
 Cedric the Entertainer

 4 wins
 Lance Gross

 3 wins
 Reggie Hayes
 Deon Cole

 2 wins
 Laurence Fishburne
 Alfonso Ribeiro

Nominations

 7 nominations
 Laurence Fishburne
 Tracy Morgan

 6 nominations
 Terry Crews

 5 nominations
 Michael Boatman
 Cedric the Entertainer
 Deon Cole
 Lance Gross

 4 nominations
 Tituss Burgess
 David Alan Grier
 Kenan Thompson
 Blair Underwood

 3 nominations
 Chico Benymon
 Andre Braugher
 Doug E. Doug
 Jay Ellis
 Reggie Hayes
 Alfonso Ribeiro
 Craig Robinson
 Dorien Wilson

 2 nominations
 Miles Brown
 Nick Cannon
 John Henton
 Boris Kodjoe
 Romany Malco
 Tim Reid
 Lamman Rucker
 Merlin Santana
 J. B. Smoove
 Marcus Scribner
 Jeremy Suarez
 John David Washington

References

NAACP Image Awards